National Tertiary Route 414, or just Route 414 (or ) is a National Road Route of Costa Rica, located in the Cartago province.

Description
In Cartago province the route covers Turrialba canton (La Suiza, Tuis, Tayutic, Chirripó districts).

References

Highways in Costa Rica